Juventud O'Higgins is a Chilean football club, their home town is Curacaví, Santiago Metropolitan Region. They currently play in the Curacaví Amateur Association.

The club founded in October 17, 1956, played between 1986 and 1997 in the third and fourth levels of the Chilean League system, winning two fourth level championships, the last one in 1993. 

Their last season was 1997, when they finalized last at the Northern group of the third level league and refused to play the next season at the fourth level because of economic issues.

Honours
 Cuarta División (2): 1985, 1993

Minor Titles

Campeonato Regional Amateur Santiago (1): 2010

Seasons played
8 seasons in Tercera División
6 seasons in Cuarta División

External links
 Regional Amateur 2010 review 

Football clubs in Chile
Sport in Santiago
Association football clubs established in 1956
1956 establishments in Chile